A World for Julius may refer to:
 A World for Julius (novel)
 A World for Julius (film)